Tantillo is a surname of Italian origin. Notable people with the surname include:

Rosie Tantillo (born 1984), American soccer player

References

Surnames of Italian origin